Charles Peale Polk (March 17, 1767 – May 6, 1822) was an American portrait painter and the nephew of artist Charles Willson Peale.

Biography
Polk was born in Annapolis, Maryland, to Elizabeth Digby Peale and Robert Polk.  At age eight or ten (sources vary on the exact age), after being orphaned, he was sent to Philadelphia to live with his uncle and study art.  He was married by the time he was eighteen and Philadelphia was his permanent residence.  By the time he was in his twenties, Polk was advertising himself as a portrait artist in Baltimore newspapers.  He was apparently not at all successful since he returned to Philadelphia within a matter of a couple years, advertising his services as a house and sign painter.  But he continued his artistic pursuits, and by 1800 he had opened exhibitions in Baltimore.  In 1800, he held government office in Washington, D.C. at the National Gallery of Art....

Artistry
Polk’s earliest paintings were copies of his uncle's originals and he was highly dependent on his uncle's training and guidance.  He continued to make copies of many paintings including his own.  It is said that he produced fifty-seven reproductions of his George Washington portrait.  He was commissioned to do thirty five paintings and this was his largest group of works from any period.  He eventually opened a drawing school and a dry-goods business.  Both ventures failed and he moved to Frederick County, Maryland.  During his period as a politician, he produced few oil paintings. However, he did produce "verre églomisé" miniatures which were made by scratching a gold leaf profile into a glass plate and painting black in the surrounding areas.   Ultimately, he took up life as a farmer in Virginia two years before his death.

In his depiction of Anna Maria Cumpston he delicately depicts a girl holding a flower.  Her arms are awkwardly posed and her gaze is blank.  Equally blank is her facial expression, which is lifeless and lacks any emotional depiction.  The background shows some soft trees against a cloudy sky.  To the right is an unbalanced large countertop.  The light values of the countertop are weighted on the opposite side by the dark trees and floors.  The dress is elegant and the figure glows apparently bathed in light.  The content seems to be meaningless and chosen more for its visual appeal and shape.  This work is very much like other works of this time period and era.

In comparing Polk’s works to Joshua Johnson, they have very similar style in positioning objects and creating composition.  The awkwardness of the works is actually somewhat appealing for both artists and probably deliberate.  Both artists often have subjects holding objects in a way that while unnatural also brings interests and causes the hands to be shaped in a visually interesting way.  The art work of both avoids expressiveness and instead chooses to emphasize capturing some likeness of the subject.

References
 Anna Maria Cumpston. The National Gallery of Art.
 Charles Peale Polk. Maryland ArtSource.
 Charles Peale Polk – Biography. National Gallery of Art.

External links
American paintings & historical prints from the Middendorf collection, an exhibition catalog from The Metropolitan Museum of Art (fully available online as PDF), which contains material on Polk (no. 13)

1767 births
1822 deaths
18th-century American painters
18th-century American male artists
American male painters
19th-century American painters
American portrait painters
Artists from Baltimore
Charles
19th-century American male artists